Sun Factory 3 is the third album in the Sun Factory series. The album was released on June 4, 2002.

Track listing

Charts

Weekly charts

Year-end charts

References

2002 compilation albums
MC Mario albums